"Come to Daddy" is a song by British electronic music producer Richard D. James, released under his main pseudonym Aphex Twin. It was released as a single through Warp Records on 6 October 1997, coinciding with the lengthier extended play release of the same name. A music video for the song was released, which ranked at number one on Pitchforks Top 50 Music Videos of 1990s list. In October 2011, NME placed the song at number 42 on its "150 Best Tracks of the Past 15 Years" list. The song peaked at number 10 on the Danish Singles Chart and number 36 on the UK Singles Chart.

Background
James noted his thoughts on the song in a 2001 interview with Index Magazine, notably being uninterested in its popularity. "'Come to Daddy' came about while I was just hanging around my house, getting pissed and doing this crappy death metal jingle. Then it got marketed and a video was made, and this little idea that I had, which was a joke, turned into something huge. It wasn't right at all." After its successful release, James claimed that he removed the record from circulation for one week, hoping to prevent it from reaching number one; it peaked at 36.

"Come to Daddy" has been interpreted as a parody of the Prodigy's hit single "Firestarter."

Music video
The music video for "Come to Daddy" (released in October 1997) was directed by Chris Cunningham and filmed on the same council estate where Stanley Kubrick shot many scenes in A Clockwork Orange. The scene is shot around Tavy Bridge Shopping centre, Thamesmead, which was demolished in 2007. Much of the dark underground car parking is now gone.

Description 
The video opens with an old woman (played by Carol Lorne) walking a dog in a grimy, industrial setting. The dog urinates on an abandoned television lying on the pavement, causing it to sputter unexpectedly into life, and a distorted and warping headshot of Richard D. James chants the lyrics. This unleashes a spirit, accompanied by a gang of small children, all of whom bear James' grinning face and who appear to inhabit the abandoned buildings. The children go around wreaking havoc, trashing an alley and chasing a man into his car. The thin man (played by Al Stokes) emerges from the television, screams in the woman's face, then gathers the children around him.

Distinctions and awards 
The video is included on the Directors Label volume, The Work of Director Chris Cunningham. The video was also named the number one video of the 1990s by Pitchfork. The video won the Golden Nica (main award) in the Digital Musics category at the Prix Ars Electronica in 1999.

Use in media
"Come to Daddy" was used in the television series Master of None in a scene where Aziz Ansari's character Dev imagines himself as a parent to two bratty children. The song was also used at the end of the Joel Schumacher film 8mm. Earlier in the film, the music video is seen playing in the background on a television set. The song (and/or album) is mentioned in Frank Ocean's 2017 single "Provider" following the line "Stiff smile just like I'm Aphex Twin". 

The song was also featured in 2005 racing game Project Gotham Racing 3 as well as being featured in 2008 racing game MotorStorm: Pacific Rift.

Track listing
 Warp – WAP94

Charts

References

External links
 

1997 singles
1997 songs
Aphex Twin songs
Music videos directed by Chris Cunningham
Songs written by Aphex Twin
Warp (record label) singles
Obscenity controversies in music